Caleb Rice (1792–1873) was an American politician and businessman. He was the first Mayor of Springfield, Massachusetts when it became a city in 1852, and the first president of MassMutual Life Insurance Company, now a Fortune 100 company.

Early years
Caleb Rice was born on April 4, 1792 in Conway, Massachusetts.  He was the son of Joseph Rice and Betty (Dickerson) Rice.  Rice married Marietta P. Parsons, daughter of Israel Parsons, in 1826.

Career
Rice served as the first Mayor of Springfield, Massachusetts when it became a city in 1852, and he was also the first president of MassMutual Life Insurance Company. Rice also served as the third Sheriff of Hampden County, Massachusetts and on the Board of Selectmen of West Springfield, Massachusetts, Additionally, Rice served for five years in the Massachusetts House of Representatives from Springfield. He died March 1, 1873.

Genealogy and family relations
Rice was a direct descendant of Edmund Rice an early immigrant to Massachusetts Bay Colony as follows:

 Caleb Rice, son of
 Joseph Rice (1768-1823), son of
 Israel Rice (1742-1833), son of
 Joseph Rice (1712-1789), son of
 Phineas Rice (1682-1768), son of
 Joseph Rice (1638-1711), son of
 Edmund Rice (circa 1594–1663)

References

1792 births
1873 deaths
Williams College alumni
American chief executives
American businesspeople in insurance
Mayors of Springfield, Massachusetts
Members of the Massachusetts House of Representatives
19th-century American politicians
People from Conway, Massachusetts
19th-century American businesspeople